Checkered Flag is a racing video game released for the Atari Lynx in 1991. A remake was released for the Atari Jaguar in 1994. Destination Software also planned to release a Game Boy Advance version of the title around 2005, but it was cancelled before it was released.

Gameplay

As with most racing video games, the object in Checkered Flag is to complete a certain number of laps. Each lap has to be completed within the time limit. Should a player make a lap before time runs out, the clock will be significantly extended, allowing the player to make more laps.

Development and release

Checkered Flag was released in 1991, created and published by the Atari Corporation. It was a pack-in game with the system in the Australian and European markets at some point in the system's life. The game can support up to six players.

Reception 

IGNs Robert A. Jung gave Checkered Flag an extremely positive review, citing it as a "masterpiece" and giving it a 10 out of 10, praised the game for its tight controls, map designs and variety and good camera angle. In Razes final issue published in October 1991, their Atari Attack segment also looked at Checkered Flag, giving a score of 86%. Conversely, French magazine Consoles + gave a score of 45%, criticizing the difficulty in getting back to the race after being spun from striking a car,  as well as the minimal effect upon contacting obstacles.

Entertainment Weekly picked the game as the #7 greatest game available in 1991, saying: "This all-frills racing game (side-and rearview mirrors, manual and automatic transmissions, a digitized voice that booms 'Gentlemen, start your engines') makes the grade for its ability to accommodate up to six players at a time, provided that each brings along his or her own hand-held Lynx equipment."

References

External links 
 Checkered Flag at AtariAge
 Checkered Flag at GameFAQs
 Checkered Flag at MobyGames

1991 video games
Atari Lynx games
Cancelled Game Boy Advance games
Racing video games
Video games developed in the United States